Shohola is an unincorporated community in Pike County, Pennsylvania, United States. The community is located along Pennsylvania Route 434 at the Delaware River, which forms the state line with New York; Barryville is across the river. Shohola has a post office with ZIP code 18458.

References

Unincorporated communities in Pike County, Pennsylvania
Unincorporated communities in Pennsylvania